Blood and Fire may refer to:

 "Blood and Fire" (Star Trek: The Next Generation), an unproduced script by David Gerrold for Star Trek: The Next Generation
 Blood and Fire (record label), a British reggae label
 Blood and Fire (film), a 1945 Swedish film
 Blood and Fire (album), an album by the Eighties Matchbox B-Line Disaster
 "Blood and Fire", a song by the Indigo Girls from Indigo Girls
 "Blood & Fire", a song by Niney the Observer
 "Blood & Fire", a song by Type O Negative from Bloody Kisses
 "Blood and Fire", the war cry of The Salvation Army
 Blood & Fire, the second entry in the Giovanni Chronicles series of tabletop game books

See also 
 Fire and Blood (disambiguation)